Marilla Guss (born 9 July 1963) is an Australian alpine skier. She competed in the women's downhill at the 1984 Winter Olympics.

References

1963 births
Living people
Australian female alpine skiers
Olympic alpine skiers of Australia
Alpine skiers at the 1984 Winter Olympics
Skiers from Melbourne